German submarine U-307 was a Type VIIC U-boat of Nazi Germany's Kriegsmarine during World War II. The U-boat was laid down on 5 November 1941, and commissioned on 18 November 1942.

Design
German Type VIIC submarines were preceded by the shorter Type VIIB submarines. U-307 had a displacement of  when at the surface and  while submerged. She had two shafts and two  propellers.

U-307 was fitted with five  torpedo tubes (four fitted at the bow and one at the stern), fourteen torpedoes, one  SK C/35 naval gun, 220 rounds, and two twin  C/30 anti-aircraft guns. The boat had a complement of between forty-four and sixty.

Service history
Despite carrying out 13 war patrols between July 1943 and April 1945, U-307 sank only two vessels; the 7,176 GRT American Liberty ship  on 30 April 1944, fifty miles south of Bear Island, and the 50 GRT Norwegian Army motor boat Lennox in Van Mijenfjorden, Spitsbergen, on 18 August 1944.

In September 1944, together with the supply ship Carl J. Busch, U-307 transported the men of Operation Haudegen, a German military meteorological mission, to Svalbard.

Wolfpacks
U-307 took part in twelve wolfpacks, namely:
 Wiking (5 September – 8 October 1943) 
 Monsun (3 October – 23 November 1943) 
 Eisenbart (28 October – 8 December 1943) 
 Boreas (28 February – 10 March 1944) 
 Thor (17 – 26 March 1944) 
 Donner (17 – 20 April 1944) 
 Donner & Keil (20 April – 3 May 1944) 
 Grimm (31 May - 6 June 1944) 
 Trutz (8 June – 10 July 1944) 
 Rasmus (6 – 13 February 1945) 
 Hagen (13 – 21 March 1945) 
 Faust (21 – 29 April 1945)

Fate
U-307 was sunk on 29 April 1945 in the Barents Sea near Murmansk, Russia, in position  by depth charges from the British Loch class frigate . There were 37 dead and 14 survivors.

Summary of raiding history

References

Bibliography

External links

German Type VIIC submarines
World War II submarines of Germany
World War II shipwrecks in the Arctic Ocean
U-boats commissioned in 1942
1942 ships
U-boats sunk by depth charges
U-boats sunk by British warships
U-boats sunk in 1945
Ships built in Lübeck
Maritime incidents in April 1945